Paama is a surname. Notable people with the surname include:

Julie Paama-Pengelly (born 1964), New Zealand artist, painter, commentator, and curator
Mart Paama (1938–2006), Estonian javelin thrower 
Matatia Paama (born 1992), Tahitian footballer